Laura Ryan (born July 4, 1992) is an American international diver from Elk River, Minnesota. She competes in one and three meter individual springboard diving and 10 meter platform diving as well as three meter synchronized springboard. She dove collegiately at Indiana University (IU) and the University of Georgia (UGA). At UGA she was a two-time NCAA champion.

Diving career

Early career
Ryan graduated from Elk River High where she was coached by Jason Baumann. She won the Minnesota state high school championship in 2007 and was a three-time Amateur Athletic Union (AAU) national champion.

Collegiate career
Ryan began her college career at Indiana University (IU) and as a freshman during the 2010–2011 season won platform, finished second on 1-meter and third on 3-meter at the Big Ten Conference championship. As an IU sophomore the next year, she finished eighth on 3-meter and 12th on both 1-meter and platform at the NCAA Women's Swimming and Diving Championships.

For her junior year, Ryan transferred to the University of Georgia (UGA) in Athens, Georgia and trained under UGA dive coach Dan Laak. As a junior Ryan was selected as a First-Team All-SEC member after finishing first on 3-meter, third on platform and 18 on 1-meter at the SEC Championships en route to helping UGA win a fourth consecutive SEC Women's conference title. She then finished fifth on platform and 13th on 3-meter at the NCAA Women's Swimming and Diving Championships to help the UGA women win the National championship. Ryan was also selected by USA Diving for the Olympic Performance Squad, the United States Canada Cup Team and the FINA Grand Prix team. Ryan also earned a spot on the UGA Athletic Director's honor roll and was selected by the College Swimming Coaches Association of America as a First-Team Scholar All-American as a psychology major.

Before Ryan's senior season in 2013-2014, she suffered a broken kneecap that hampered her most of the season; however, she rebounded with a first-place finish in 3-meter and platform and a third-place finish in 1-meter to help UGA win its fifth consecutive Women's SEC championship. At the NCAA Championships, she won individual championships in both the 1 meter and 3 meter springboard events and finished third in the 10 meter platform event as UGA won a second consecutive Women's team national championship. Academically, Ryan was selected for the UGA Student-Athlete Leadership Academy, the Ramsey Scholarship for Academic/Athletic Excellence, the UGA Athletic Director's Honor Roll and the Dean's List.

International career
In 2013, Ryan teamed with Meghan Houston to win the bronze medal in women's synchronized 3-meter at the World University Games in Kazan, Russia, and Ryan also won silver in the team competition. The 2014 season marks Ryan's fifth consecutive year as a member of the United States national diving team (2010 - 2014). Ryan has also qualified for the 19th FINA Diving World Cup that will take place in Shanghai in 2014.

See also

 Georgia Bulldogs

References

External links
  profile at USA Diving.

University of Georgia alumni
Georgia Bulldogs women's divers
1992 births
Living people
American female divers
People from Elk River, Minnesota
Universiade medalists in diving
Indiana Hoosiers women's divers
Universiade silver medalists for the United States
Universiade bronze medalists for the United States
Medalists at the 2013 Summer Universiade